Parliamentary elections were held in Hungary on 16 November 1958. They were the first elections held after the Hungarian Revolution of 1956. The Communist Hungarian Working People's Party had been reorganized as the Hungarian Socialist Workers' Party, under the leadership of a more moderate Communist, János Kádár. However, as was the case during the era of Mátyás Rákosi, voters were presented with a single list of Communists and pro-Communist independents. The Socialist Workers' Party won 276 of the 338 seats, with the remaining 62 going to independents.

Results

References

Elections in Hungary
Parliamentary
Hungary
One-party elections

hu:Országgyűlési választások a Magyar Népköztársaságban#1958